Axact is a Pakistan software company that runs numerous websites selling fraudulent academic degrees. The company also owns the media company BOL Network.

History 
Axact was founded by Shoaib Ahmed Shaikh, who serves as its chairman. It is based in Karachi, and has over 2,000 employees.  According to Shaikh, the company was founded in 1997 with fewer than 10 employees working in a single room. In 2013 he said Axact was the world's leading IT company and that it had eight broad-business units and products, more than 5,200 employees, and associated globally and as many as 8.3 million customers worldwide. The company website said in 2015 that the company had 10 diverse business units that offer more than 23 products, more than two billion users, and a global presence across 6 continents, 120 countries and 1,300 cities with more than 25,000 employees and associates.

According to Securities and Exchange Commission of Pakistan records, the company was registered in June 2006 and had a paid up capital of Rs. 6 million by 2010. Government records show that it paid an income tax of approximately  Rs. 18,90,000 for the year 2014, and that Shaikh paid a personal income tax of Rs. 26 for the same year.

In September 2018, Shoaib Shaikh, the owner and CEO was arrested and sentenced to 20 years for the scam along with 22 of his staff members.

Fake diplomas scandal

The New York Times investigation
On 17 May 2015, The New York Times published an investigative story reporting that Axact ran at least 370 degree and accreditation mill websites. The report said that although the company did sell software, chiefly website design and smartphone applications, its main business was "to take the centuries-old scam of selling fake academic degrees and turn it into an Internet-era scheme on a global scale." The Times further reported that the company had around 2,000 employees, some of whom pretended to be American educational officials and worked in shifts to keep the company open 24 hours per day.

Company response
Axact has denied all the allegations. The company accused The New York Times of "baseless, substandard reporting" as part of a plot by rival news organizations to stop the BOL Network, which was scheduled to start operations soon. It also threatened several news organizations and bloggers reporting on the issue with lawsuits.

Initially Shaikh denied any association with the fake educational websites besides selling them software. Later he said that while Axact did provide office support and call center services to the websites, it did not itself "issue any degree or diploma, whether fake or real."

Official investigations
Following the publication of the New York Times article, Pakistan's interior minister Chaudhry Nisar Ali Khan directed the country's  Federal Investigation Agency to begin inquiry  into whether the company was involved in any illegal business. Following the interior minister's order, a cyber crime team of the FIA raided Axact's offices in Karachi and Islamabad and seized computers, recorded statements of employees and took into custody 25 employees of the company and 28 employees from Rawalpindi office. The FIA team found and seized several blank degrees as well as fake letterhead of the US State Department. The investigation was transferred from the FIA's cyber crime department to its corporate department.

The issue was also taken up in the Senate of Pakistan where Chairman of the Senate Raza Rabbani constituted a committee to probe into the issue. Pakistan's tax authorities and the SECP also initiated investigations into the company.
 
New details released on 10 April 2016 in the report state that this scandal is “bigger than initially imagined."

It is alleged that Axact took money from over 215,000 people in 197 countries; that the CEO Shoaib Shaikh is the owner of several shell companies in the US and other Caribbean countries that were used to route the monies into Pakistan; that Shaikh used an alias on documentation linked to these offshore companies; that Shaikh became a citizen of Saint Kitts and Nevis, a small Caribbean island nation that sells passports to rich investors; that Axact sales agents' employees used "threats and false promises" and impersonated government officials to take money from customers generally in the Middle East; and that the company earned at least  in its final year of operation.

Axact CEO Shoaib Shaikh was acquitted of money laundering charges in August 2016 due to lack of evidence. Criminal charges concerning alleged fake degrees were concluded in 2018. During the investigations, Pakistan Chief Justice called the scam a national shame. A sessions court in Pakistan on July 5, 2018, convicted Shoaib Sheikh and 22 others in the case and sentenced them to 20 years in prison. The judge also imposed a fine of Rs1.3 million on each of the convicts.

In Dec 2016, Umair Hamid, 30, the Axact's Assistant Vice President of International Relations was arrested and charged in a criminal complaint filed in federal court in Manhattan with wire fraud, conspiracy to commit wire fraud and aggravated identity theft for his Axact-related activities. Hamid was found guilty in August 2017 and sentenced to 21 months in prison.

Further revelations 

Most of Axact's revenues from its fake diploma sales came from the United Arab Emirates, where hundreds of residents used Axact diplomas to obtain high-paying jobs. Axact sold over 200,000 fake degrees in Gulf countries. More recently, Axact employees have impersonated Emirati government officials in an effort to extort "legalisation fees" from unsuspecting fake degree and diploma holders in that country.

The Canadian Broadcasting Corporation's television series Marketplace carried out an investigation into the prevalence of fake academic credentials.  Its September 15, 2017 documentary focused on Canadians with fake degrees occupying positions such as college instructors and medical doctors.  All the suspect certificates were found to be from Axact.

Network of websites
A New York Times investigation identified more than 370 websites associated with Axact's alleged fake diploma operations, including 145 sites for fictitious universities, 41 for high schools, 18 for fake accreditation boards, and 121 degree portals. The following is an incomplete list of those websites:

Educational websites

Accreditation websites

References

External links 
 

 
Pakistani companies established in 1997
Companies based in Karachi
Software companies established in 1997
Fraud in Pakistan
Private universities and colleges in California
Internet fraud
Unaccredited institutions of higher learning in Pakistan
Unaccredited institutions of higher learning in the United States